The Marriage Escape, in  (The Bones of Saint Hildegard) is a 2020 Dutch film directed by Johan Nijenhuis. The film is an adaptation of the 2016 Czech film Tiger Theory, and it is the first cinema film predominantly spoken in the Tweants variety of Low Saxon, although the title is in Dutch.

The film won the Golden Film award after having sold 100,000 tickets and the film also won the Platinum Film award after having sold 400,000 tickets. In total, more than 710,000 tickets were sold and the film became the best visited Dutch film and highest-grossing Dutch film of 2020. It was also the third best visited film in the Netherlands in 2020, with 1917 and Tenet in first and second place respectively.

In December 2020, it was announced that The Marriage Escape was the best Dutch film of 2020 according to the 'Kring van Nederlandse Filmjournalisten', the Dutch organisation for professional film journalists and film critics. In September 2021, Herman Finkers received the Zilveren Krulstaart award for best screenplay of a 2020 Dutch film.

On Koningsdag 2021, the film premiered on television with 2,500,000 viewers, making it the best viewed film on Dutch television since 2002.

References

External links 
 

2020 films
2020 comedy-drama films
Dutch comedy-drama films
2020s Dutch-language films
2020s German-language films
Films directed by Johan Nijenhuis
2020 multilingual films
Dutch multilingual films